The 2016 Ritsumeikan Panthers football team represents Ritsumeikan University in the Kansai Collegiate American Football League during the 2016 season. Ritsumeikan plays their home games at Nishikyogoku Athletic Stadium in Kyoto, Japan.

Before the Season

Previous season

Schedule

Preseason

Regular season

References

External links
 

American football in Japan
Ritsumeikan
Ritsumeikan